Dobrokhotov is a masculine Russian surname.

People 
 Alexander Dobrokhotov (born 1950), a Russian philosopher and historian.
 Gennady Dobrokhotov (born 1948), a Soviet boxer.
 Nikolay Dobrokhotov (1889-1963), a Soviet scientist and metallurgist.
 Roman Dobrokhotov (born 1983), a Russian journalist.

References

Russian-language surnames